Gazela is a natural gas pipeline in the Czech Republic. It is operated by Net4Gas, a company owned by Allianz Capital Partners and OMERS Infrastructure. The project cost around €400 million.

History
Construction started on 14 October 2010 in Krušné Hory, north Bohemia.  It was constructed by Russian Stroytransgaz.

The pipeline was officially opened on 14 January 2013.

Route
The pipeline connects the north Bohemian town of Hora Svaté Kateřiny and Rozvadov/Waidhaus on the Czech–German border.  These are natural gas border delivery stations by which Russian gas is transported from the Czech Republic to Germany. In north the Gazela pipeline is connected to the OPAL pipeline, a connection pipeline to Nord Stream 1.

The pipeline will divert from the existing pipelines only in the Mladotice–Chomutov section.

See also

Energy in the Czech Republic
Rehden-Hamburg gas pipeline
MIDAL
NEL pipeline

References

2012 establishments in the Czech Republic
Energy infrastructure completed in 2012
Natural gas pipelines in the Czech Republic